The 1886 Brentford by-election was held on 23 December 1886 following the death of the incumbent Conservative MP, Octavius Coope on 27 November 1886.

Candidates
The Conservative Party candidate was James Bigwood who had been MP for Finsbury East from 1885 until being defeated at the 1886 general election. Bigwood was a partner in the firm of Champion & Co., mustard and vinegar manufacturers located in Finsbury.

The Liberal Party candidate was James Haysman. Haysman had contested this constituency at the 1885 and 1886 general elections.

There were six polling stations: Brentford Town Hall, Twickenham Town Hall, Isleworth board school, Norwood Green board school, Hanwell board school, and Hounslow board school.

Result

References

Brentford by-election
Brentford,1886
1886 in England
1886 in London
Brentford,1886